Peter George Hansford  is an English civil engineer. He served as the 146th President of the Institution of Civil Engineers (ICE) (2010-2011) and succeeded Paul Morrell as the UK government's chief construction adviser in November 2012.

Career
Hansford studied civil engineering at the University of Nottingham, and then worked at Amey Roadstone Construction and Maunsell Consultations Asia in Hong Kong. He later joined the Nichols Group, working as engineering manager for London's Docklands Light Railway City extension and Beckton extension projects (1989-1992). He also has a MBA from Cranfield University.

Hansford is a Fellow of the ICE and of the Association for Project Management, and chaired the ICE's expert panel contributing to the UK government's Low Carbon Construction IGT report (2010), a key building block of the industry reforms started by Morrell.

He was appointed Commander of the Order of the British Empire (CBE) in the 2020 New Year Honours for services to innovation in civil engineering.

Infrastructure Steering Committee

Hansford, ICE Past President, chaired the Infrastructure Steering Committee (ISC), a group of leading clients, consultants, contractors and academics who were a focal point for industry input into the work of the IUK Infrastructure Cost Review implementation programme. This Industry Standards Group report was prepared in response to the 2010 Infrastructure Cost Review programme.

Involved with the Infrastructure UK cost study, Hansford has also worked on various strategic reviews including ones for the Highways Agency, the Nuclear Decommissioning Authority and Network Rail.

Chief Construction Adviser

On 2 July 2014, construction minister Michael Fallon announced that Hansford's term of office would be extended to November 2015. In July 2015, the Government announced that "the role of the Chief Construction Adviser will not be continued after the incumbent Peter Hansford’s tenure ends in November 2015."

References

British civil engineers
Living people
Alumni of Cranfield University
Presidents of the Institution of Civil Engineers
Year of birth missing (living people)
Commanders of the Order of the British Empire